Rimas Álvarez Kairelis (born 22 July 1974 in Quilmes, Buenos Aires) is an Argentine rugby union footballer. He currently plays for Perpignan in the Top 14 in France. He has represented Argentina, and was part of the Argentinian squad  at the 2003 Rugby World Cup and 2007 Rugby World Cup. His usual position is at lock.

Álvarez made his international debut in October 1998, as a replacement, in a match against Paraguay. He made his first start in his next match, against Chile. He played one other match for Argentina that year, against Uruguay.

He next played international rugby in May 2001, against Uruguay and Canada, and was capped another three times at the end of the season, in matches against Wales, Scotland and the All Blacks.

He played six internationals during the 2002 season, three during June, and three during the November Tests series. He played in games against France and South Africa in June 2003, and played another three games in August, and was then included in Argentina's squad for the 2003 Rugby World Cup in Australia.

He played in the games against Namibia and Ireland during the World Cup pool stages. He played two internationals in 2004, and then next played for Argentina in June 2006. In 2007 he was selected to play for Argentina at the 2007 Rugby World Cup.

Álvares has an engineering degree from the U.N.L.P.

Rimas has Lithuanian ancestry and also holds a Lithuanian passport.

References

External links
UAR profile
 Rimas Alvarez on rwc2003.irb.com
Rimas Alvarez rwc2007 profile

1974 births
People from Quilmes
Argentine rugby union players
Argentine expatriate sportspeople in France
Expatriate rugby union players in France
Living people
Rugby union locks
Argentine people of Lithuanian descent
USA Perpignan players
Argentina international rugby union players
Argentine expatriate rugby union players
Argentina international rugby sevens players
Sportspeople from Buenos Aires Province